This is a list of season 7 episodes of the Extreme Makeover: Home Edition series.

Episodes

See also
 List of Extreme Makeover: Home Edition episodes
 Extreme Makeover: Home Edition Specials

Notes

References 

2010 American television seasons
2009 American television seasons